No Idea Records is an American independent record label based in Gainesville, Florida which focuses on punk rock and its sub-styles and produces both vinyl records and compact discs. The label also organizes The Fest, an independently operated annual festival known for featuring over 250 punk, pop punk, country, heavy metal, indie rock, avant-garde and other musical acts across many venues for 3 days in Gainesville each fall.

No Idea Records started not as a record label, but as a zine in 1985, published independently by Var Thelin and Ken Coffelt and some friends of theirs from high school. By the seventh issue in 1989, Var was running the zine with Sarah Dyer and other contributors and collaborators. Starting with the sixth edition, the No Idea zine included 7-inch records with each issue. The first featured a local Gainesville band called Doldrums, and the second was a split 7-inch, one side of which belonged to later Bay Area legends Crimpshrine, a major influence on the musical style which dominates No Idea to the present.

Since its beginnings, No Idea has remained a foundation of the Gainesville punk scene and is considered by many to have spawned its very own style of punk, sometimes half-jokingly referred to as "beard punk" or "beardcore" due to the large proportion of members in bands having beards, or more commonly as variations of emo, post-hardcore and pop punk. The label has also worked with grindcore and metalcore bands like Left for Dead, Acrid, Bombs of Death, Crucible and The Swarm aka Knee Deep in the Dead.

Artists

Against Me!
Alkaline Trio
Ampere
Assholeparade
Atom & His Package
Bridge and Tunnel
Cheap Girls
Chuck Ragan
Coalesce
Combatwoundedveteran
Dead Bars
Defiance, Ohio
Dillinger Four
The Draft
The Ergs!
Floor
Good Luck
Hot Water Music
I Hate Myself
J Church
Jawbreaker
Latterman
Leatherface
Lemuria
Less Than Jake
Me First and the Gimme Gimmes
Moonraker
Mustard Plug
New Mexican Disaster Squad
No Friends
Off With Their Heads
Paul Baribeau
Planes Mistaken for Stars
Rehasher
Riverboat Gamblers
Rumbleseat
Samiam
Seaweed
Shores
Small Brown Bike
Strike Anywhere
Sunshine State
This Bike Is a Pipe Bomb
Tomorrow
Twelve Hour Turn
Western Addiction
A Wilhelm Scream
Worn in Red

Compilations
V/A – Back to Donut!
V/A – Bread: The Edible Napkin
V/A – Down in Front
V/A – Read Army Faction
V/A – No Idea 100: Redefiling Music
V/A – Tour Diary
V/A – Sight and Sound: The History of the Future
V/A – The Shape of Flakes to Come

See also
 List of record labels

References

External links
 Official site

American independent record labels
Punk record labels
1985 establishments in Florida
Companies based in Gainesville, Florida